Heinrich Eckstein (May 9, 1907 – August 6, 1992) was a German politician of the Christian Democratic Union (CDU) and former member of the German Bundestag.

Life 
He was a member of the German Bundestag from the first federal elections in 1949 to 1957. He was elected directly to parliament in the constituency of Bersenbrück-Lingen in 1949 and 1953.

Literature

References

1907 births
1992 deaths
Members of the Bundestag for Lower Saxony
Members of the Bundestag 1953–1957
Members of the Bundestag 1949–1953
Members of the Bundestag for the Christian Democratic Union of Germany